Jan Adhikar Party (Loktantrik); English: People's Rights Party (Democratic) is a political party in Bihar, India. The party was formed by Indian politician Pappu Yadav in May 2015.

Pappu Yadav wa a Member of Parliament from Madhepura and was expelled from Rashtriya Janata Dal for years due to anti-party activities. The party was launched just before 2015 Bihar Legislative Assembly election. Pappu Yadav campaigned against Nitish-Lalu Alliance.

2015 Bihar Elections 
Jan Adhikar Party (L) fought on 64 seats as part of Socialist Secular Morcha which comprises Samajwadi Party, Nationalist Congress Party, National People's Party, Samajwadi Janata Dal Democratic and Samras Samaj Party.

The party was not able to win a single seat in 2015 Bihar Legislative Assembly election and collected 1.04% of vote in the election.

2020 Bihar Elections 
Election Commission of India provided new symbol 'scissors' in Bihar Assembly Election 2020. JAP(L) contested under Progressive Democratic Alliance.

External links
 Official Website of Rajesh Ranjan (Pappu Yadav) 
 Official Website of Jan Adhikar Party (Loktantrik)

References

Political parties established in 2015
2015 establishments in Bihar
Janata Parivar
Political parties in Bihar